The A. S. Gage Ranch is a  cattle ranch located in Brewster and Presidio Counties in west Texas. Today's ranch is only a part of what was a once much larger operation founded in 1883 by Alfred S. Gage. It is still in the family, being owned and operated by Alfred's granddaughters Roxana Hayne and Joan Kelleher. Joan is the wife of Herb Kelleher, founder of Southwest Airlines.

References

External links
Gage Ranch in the Handbook of Texas

Buildings and structures in Brewster County, Texas
Buildings and structures in Presidio County, Texas
Ranches in Texas
1883 establishments in Texas
American companies established in 1883
Food and drink companies established in 1883